Baranduzchay-ye Shomali  Rural District is in the Central District of Urmia County, West Azerbaijan province, Iran. At the National Census of 2006, its population was 7,466 in 1,996 households. There were 7,529 inhabitants in 2,285 households at the following census of 2011. At the most recent census of 2016, the population of the rural district was 8,486 in 2,660 households. The largest of its 20 villages was Gug Tappeh, with 2,850 people.

References 

Urmia County

Rural Districts of West Azerbaijan Province

Populated places in West Azerbaijan Province

Populated places in Urmia County